Muhammed Shakhbari (born 2 January 1990), is an Arab-Israeli footballer. He is now playing for Maccabi Ahi Iksal.

References

1990 births
Living people
Arab citizens of Israel
Arab-Israeli footballers
Israeli footballers
Maccabi Ahi Nazareth F.C. players
Ahva Arraba F.C. players
F.C. Tzeirei Kafr Kanna players
Hapoel Ironi Baqa al-Gharbiyye F.C. players
Hapoel Kafr Kanna F.C. players
Maccabi Ironi Kiryat Ata F.C. players
Footballers from Nazareth
Association football defenders